Progress in Neuro-Psychopharmacology & Biological Psychiatry is a peer-reviewed academic journal publishing review articles and original research reports pertaining to neuropsychopharmacology and biological psychiatry.

Background 
The journal was established in 1977 as Progress in Neuro-Psychopharmacology, obtaining its current name in 1982. It is published eight times per year by Elsevier. The editor-in-chief is Louis Gendron (Université de Sherbrooke). According to the Journal Citation Reports, the journal has a 2020 impact factor of 5.067.

References

External links

Publications established in 1977
Elsevier academic journals
Neuroscience journals
Psychiatry journals
English-language journals
Pharmacology journals
8 times per year journals